Juan María Emery Alza (18 February 1933 – 10 May 2015) was a Spanish footballer who played as a goalkeeper. He spent most of his career in the Segunda División, appearing in 204 games over 14 seasons.

Club career
Born in Irun, Gipuzkoa, Emery began playing professionally with CD Logroñés, making his Segunda División debut in a 2–1 home win over Cultural y Deportiva Leonesa on 7 November 1954. After the club's relegation at the end of his third season, he moved to his hometown side Real Unión, suffering the same fate in 1959.

Subsequently, Emery signed for Deportivo de La Coruña, where he spent a further three campaigns in the second division. He contributed 14 games as his team promoted to La Liga in 1962, as champions, but remained in the former tier until his retirement, in representation of Sporting de Gijón, Recreativo de Huelva and Granada CF, before retiring in 1967 after a spell with amateurs Real Jaén.

Emery was comparatively short for a goalkeeper at 1.73 m, but was remembered for his quick reflexes.

Personal life
Emery's father, Antonio, was also a footballer and a goalkeeper, playing mainly for Real Unión. His son, Unai, was a midfielder who later went into management, notably with Valencia CF and Sevilla FC; his elder brother, Román, was also a midfielder, and the two shared teams at Logroñés.

Emery died on 10 May 2015 in Hondarribia, aged 82.

References

External links

1933 births
2015 deaths
Sportspeople from Irun
Spanish footballers
Footballers from the Basque Country (autonomous community)
Association football goalkeepers
Segunda División players
Tercera División players
Deportivo Alavés players
Burgos CF (1936) footballers
CD Logroñés footballers
Real Unión footballers
Deportivo de La Coruña players
Sporting de Gijón players
Recreativo de Huelva players
Granada CF footballers
Real Jaén footballers
Emery family